is a Japanese animator and character designer. She has participated in numerous anime TV series produced by Bee Train and Studio Fantasia. She is married to fellow animator Eiji Suganuma, and in 2000 they had a child.

Filmography

Anime television

Anime films

OVA (Original video animations)

References

External links 
 
 
 Yoko Kikuchi anime at Media Arts Database 

Bee Train Production
Living people
Production I.G
Japanese animators
Anime character designers
Japanese film directors
Japanese animated film directors
Year of birth missing (living people)